Ola High School was a public high school located in Ola, Arkansas, serving grades 7–12. Student teacher ratio was 9.5 to 1. Ola High School was administered by the Ola School District until July 1, 2004, and then the Two Rivers School District. The school was closed in 2010 with the establishment of Two Rivers High School.

Academics 
The assumed course of study for students followed the Smart Core curriculum developed by the Arkansas Department of Education (ADE), which requires scholars to obtain 22 units before graduation. Students completed regular and Advanced Placement (AP) coursework and exams.

Based on the 2009–10 school year, which was the school's last, Ola High School was nationally recognized with the Bronze Award in the Best High Schools 2012 report developed by U.S. News & World Report.

Extracurricular activities 
The Ola High School mascot and athletic emblem was the Mustangs.

References

External links
 

Defunct schools in Arkansas
Schools in Yell County, Arkansas
Public high schools in Arkansas
Public middle schools in Arkansas
2010 disestablishments in Arkansas
Educational institutions disestablished in 2010